Lisbon is the name of two towns in the state of Wisconsin:

Lisbon, Juneau County, Wisconsin
Lisbon, Waukesha County, Wisconsin